The 1998 Men's Asian Games Basketball Tournament was held in Thailand from 8 to 19 December 1998.

Results

Preliminary round

Group A

Group B

Group C

Group D

Classification 9th–12th

Quarterfinals

Group I

Group II

Classification 5th–8th

7th place game

5th place game

Final round

Semifinals

Bronze medal game

Gold medal game

Final standing

References
Results

External links
Results

Men